Big Philou (foaled in 1965) was a notable New Zealand bred Thoroughbred racehorse. He was by the good sire Le Filou (imported from France) from Pink Lady by Contact and he was trained by Bart Cummings.

He is best remembered for the controversy surrounding his withdrawal from the 1969 VRC Melbourne Cup when as the hot favourite he was the victim of a doping scandal and was withdrawn from the race 39 minutes before the start.

Jockey Roy Higgins believed that the horse was a certainty to win the race.

Rain Lover went on to win the Cup and created history as the first back-to-back winner since Archer in 1861 and 1862.
 
Although he missed out on winning a Melbourne Cup the horse did record wins in the 1969 VATC Caulfield Cup, 1970 VRC Queen Elizabeth Stakes (Autumn) and the 1970 VATC Underwood Stakes.

Pedigree

References

External links
 Big Philou's pedigree

1965 racehorse births
Racehorses bred in New Zealand
Racehorses trained in Australia
Caulfield Cup winners
Thoroughbred family 20-a